Fabio Herbert Kaufmann (born 8 September 1992) is a German professional footballer who plays as a right winger for  club Eintracht Braunschweig.

Career
After impressive performances for SSV Ulm in fourth-tier Regionalliga Südwest, Kaufmann was signed by his former youth and then 2. Bundesliga club VfR Aalen in summer 2013.

In the 2019–20 season Kaufmann helped Würzburger Kickers promote to the 2. Bundesliga contributing 14 goals and 12 assists.

In July 2020, Kaufmann left Würzburger Kickers on a free transfer joining Eintracht Braunschweig, who had also achieved promotion to the 2. Bundesliga the previous season. He agreed a two-year contract with Eintracht Braunschweig.

On 23 June 2022, Kaufmann returned to Eintracht Braunschweig after one year away.

Personal life
Kaufmann is of Italian descent through his maternal grandparents, who are from Naples. In 1998, Kaufmann sang "Un cuoricino in più" (Ein Schwesterlein in German) at Zecchino d'Oro.

References

External links
 

1992 births
Living people
German people of Italian descent
German footballers
People from Aalen
Sportspeople from Stuttgart (region)
Zecchino d'Oro singers
Association football wingers
VfR Aalen players
SSV Ulm 1846 players
FC Energie Cottbus players
FC Erzgebirge Aue players
Würzburger Kickers players
Eintracht Braunschweig players
Karlsruher SC players
2. Bundesliga players
3. Liga players
Regionalliga players
Oberliga (football) players
Footballers from Baden-Württemberg